Conroy Point is a headland midway along the northwest side of Moe Island in the South Orkney Islands. It was named by the UK Antarctic Place-Names Committee after James W.H. Conroy, ornithologist on Signy Island, 1967–68.

References
 

Headlands of the South Orkney Islands